Petunia Pickle Bottom is an American manufacturer of diaper bags, handbags (branded only as "Petunia") and other women's accessories.

The company was founded in 2000 in Ventura, California by DeNai and Braden Jones together with Korie Conant. Its products became fashionable in the U.S. after being featured on Oprah Winfrey's talk show.

References

Luggage manufacturers
Fashion accessory brands
Manufacturing companies based in California
Companies based in Ventura County, California
American companies established in 2000
Clothing companies established in 2000
2000 establishments in California